National Ambassador for Young People's Literature is a literary honor presented bi-annually by the Library of Congress to an author or illustrator who is a U.S. citizen and who has made a substantial contribution to young people's literature. The position was established in 2008. More than receiving an award, during their tenure ambassadors help communicate to children about books and reading, so the selection criteria include being an effective communicator, having a dynamic personality and the ability to work with children. The position is modeled on the British Children's Laureate, which was established in 1999. The position is currently sponsored by the Center for the Book and the Children's Book Council. The ambassadorship includes a $15,000 expense stipend. A similar honor is awarded bi-annually by the Poetry Foundation for the Young People's Poet Laureate (formerly the Children's Poet Laureate).

Ambassadors
 2008–2009: Jon Scieszka
 2010–2011: Katherine Paterson
 2012–2013: Walter Dean Myers
 2014–2015: Kate DiCamillo
 2016–2017: Gene Luen Yang
 2018-2019: Jacqueline Woodson
2020-2021 Jason Reynolds

References

External links
National Ambassador for Young People's Literature

Library of Congress
Awards established in 2008
Literary awards honoring writers
American children's literary awards
American children's literature